Gomberg is a surname. It may refer to:

David Gomberg (born 1953), American small business owner, kite flier and politician
Guy Gomberg (born 1990), Israeli footballer
Harold Gomberg (1916–1985), American oboist (brother of Ralph)
Joan Gomberg (born 1957), American research geophysicist
Moses Gomberg (1866–1947), American chemist
Ralph Gomberg (1921–2006), American oboist (brother of Harold)
Sheldon Gomberg, music producer and engineer and bassist
Sy Gomberg (1918–2001), American film screenwriter, producer and activist 
Tooker Gomberg (1955–2004), Canadian politician and environmental activist